Signature file may refer to:

 A file containing signature values to be used in signature-based detection of viruses
 In document retrieval the signature file method competes with the inverted index method to produce query results.
 A signature block, or sig file is a block of text automatically appended at the bottom of an email message.
 A file containing a digital signature
 Electronic signature